.gt is the Internet country code top-level domain (ccTLD) for Guatemala. Registrations are taken directly at the second level under .gt, as well as third level under some second level labels.

Second level domains

 .com.gt: Commercial entities
 .edu.gt: Educational institutions
 .net.gt: Networks; unrestricted in registration
 .gob.gt: Guatemalan governmental entities
 .org.gt: Organizations; unrestricted in registration
 .mil.gt: Guatemalan military entities
 .ind.gt: Individuals

See also
Internet in Guatemala

References

External links
 Registrar .GT
 IANA .gt whois information
 ccTLD www.GT

Communications in Guatemala
Country code top-level domains

sv:Toppdomän#G